Rahmania is a suburb of the city of Algiers in northern Algeria.

Communes of Algiers Province
Cities in Algeria
Algeria